Oba  (or Obaköy) is a town in Alanya district of Antalya Province, Turkey. At , it is almost merged to Alanya. The population of Oba is 16,498 as of 2011. In the Medieval age, Oba was the capital of Alaiye Beylik. In 1934, a part of Oba was issued from the main settlement to form the Çıplaklı village. In 1999, Oba was declared a seat of township. The main crops of the town are citrus and dwarf apple. Being very close to Alanya, services to the city are also a part in the town economy.

Notable residents 

 Kaygusuz Abdal (14th and early 15th-century Turkish folk poet)

Sister cities 

  Pniewy (Poland)
  Oer-Erkenschwick (Germany)

References

Populated places in Antalya Province
Towns in Turkey
Alanya District